Mad TV was a sketch comedy television show.

Mad TV may also refer to:
Mad TV (video game), a simulation game
MAD TV (TV channel), a Greek music television channel

See also
Mad (TV series)